Major Ulysses Grant Lee Jr., Ph.D. (December 4, 1913 – January 7, 1969) was a U.S. soldier, scholar, professor, writer, editor and American military historian. He contributed to the Federal Writers' Project, co-edited The Negro Caravan with Sterling Brown and Arthur P. Davis, and wrote the official U.S. military history of African-American service in World War II, The Employment of Negro Troops, published in 1963 by the United States Army Center of Military History. In addition his own service, Lee was connected to the military history of African Americans through his grandfather, who served in the Union Army, and his father, a Buffalo Soldier.

Life and work 
Lee was a graduate of the notable majority-black Dunbar High School in Washington, D.C., historically black university Howard University and after earning his doctorate at the University of Chicago after World War II, later taught at the historically black Morgan State University. At Howard he was a founding member of the short-lived Gamma Tau fraternity that was organized as an alternative to the extant system. In 1940 he was awarded a Rosenwald Fellowship toward creating a book on the anti-slavery press in the U.S. while studying at the University of Chicago. Having been in ROTC at Howard, Lee was initially commissioned a first lieutenant with the Tuskegee Airmen. He was the author-editor of the Army Service Forces manual, Leadership and the Negro Soldier, published in 1944. He served with the office of the Chief of Military History from 1946 to 1952, retiring as a major after 10 years of active duty. The Employment of  Negro Troops was largely written between 1947 and 1951 but not published (in somewhat altered/edited form) until a decade later. Robert R. Kirsch, the Los Angeles Times book editor, called it "incisive and penetrating...takes up the hard questions and does not compromise on the answers."

Dr. Lee served as a contributor or editor on several notable literature projects (usually with a focus on "Negro history and culture") including The Negro Caravan and the Federal Writers' Project. Lee's FWP work included contributions to the American Guide Series book City and Capital (1937) and The Negro in Virginia (1940). The Negro in Virginia is considered the most successful of the FWP's African-American history publications, it was said to have attained "the vibrancy of literature." Lee, along with Sterling Brown and Arthur P. Davis, was a co-editor of Caravan, a pioneering anthology of African-American literature first published in 1942. One reviewer, Harvey Curtis Webster, wrote of the book, "The pleasure of reading The Negro Caravan is hardly undermined by the fact that one emerges a more enlightened human being." In her newspaper column My Day, Eleanor Roosevelt wrote that The Negro Caravan "should be in everyone's library."

In the year prior to his sudden death from a heart attack at age 56 he was studying the socioeconomically- and thus racially-disproportionate impacts of Vietnam-era military draft system.

Personal 
Lee, the oldest child of seven children, came from a military family. His grandfather served in the Union Army. His father (February 12, 1864 – April 23, 1937) was born in Washington, D.C. and was a "cavalryman at Indian Country posts and then in the Philippines." Ulysses Grant Lee Sr. served a five-year stint with Company I of the 25th Infantry Regiment (enlisted August 5, 1886, discharged August 4, 1891). At the time of the 1920 census Ulysses Lee Sr. was working as a dry-goods merchant.

Dr. Lee's funeral was at the Washington National Cathedral in Washington, D.C. Sterling Brown of Howard University gave the eulogy. Dr. Lee is buried at Lincoln Memorial Cemetery in Suitland, Maryland.

Notes

References 

1913 births
1969 deaths
20th-century American historians
American male non-fiction writers
African-American historians
Historians of African Americans
Black studies scholars
African-American non-fiction writers
Morgan State University faculty
Lincoln University (Missouri) faculty
Howard University alumni
African-American United States Army personnel
African-American history of the United States military
United States Army personnel of World War II
Military families of the United States